The 1961 Western Michigan Broncos football team represented Western Michigan University in the Mid-American Conference (MAC) during the 1961 NCAA University Division football season.  In their fifth season under head coach Merle Schlosser, the Broncos compiled a 5–4–1 record (4–1–1 against MAC opponents), finished in second place in the MAC, and were outscored by their opponents, 179 to 143.  The team played its home games at Waldo Stadium in Kalamazoo, Michigan.

Center Mike Snodgrass and guard Ken Reasor were the team captains. Quarterback Ed Chlebek received the team's most outstanding player award.

Schedule

References

Western Michigan
Western Michigan Broncos football seasons
Western Michigan Broncos football